Sir John Knyvet (1394/95–1445), of Southwick, Northamptonshire, Hamerton, Huntingdonshire and Mendlesham, Suffolk, was an English MP. In December 1421, he was a Member of Parliament for Northamptonshire.

He was the son and heir of John Knyvet (1358/9–1418) by his first wife Joan Boutetout (d.c.1417), daughter and heiress of Sir John Boutetout (d. by 1377) of Mendlesham by his wife Katherine.

By 1412 he had married Elizabeth (d.1441), daughter of Constantine, 2nd Lord Clifton (1372–95) of Buckenharn Castle, Norfolk by his wife Margaret, sister of Sir John Howard and heiress of her brother Sir John Clifton (d.s.p. 1447).

He had been knighted by December 1418.

His ancestral home of Southwick was inherited by his daughter, Joan, and her husband, John Lynne (d.1486/7). The rest of his property was inherited by his son and heir of the same name, John. He had married in August 1430, Alice Lynne, the sister of his sister Joan’s husband John Lynne. John Knyvet and Alice Lynne were the parents of Sir William Knyvett (d.1515).

References

1394 births
1445 deaths
15th-century English people
English MPs 1420
English MPs December 1421
People from Hamerton
People from Northamptonshire
Politicians from Suffolk